George Augustine Thomas O'Brien (26 January 1892 – 31 December 1973) was an Irish politician, economist and academic. He was first elected to Seanad Éireann as an independent member in 1948 by the National University constituency. He was re-elected in 1951, 1954, 1957 and 1961. He lost his seat at the 1965 election.

He was Professor of National Economics and later Political Economy at University College Dublin from 1921 to 1961. He was president of the Statistical and Social Inquiry Society of Ireland between 1942 and 1946. In the 1950s he was appointed to the board of the Guinness brewery, then one of Ireland's largest companies, and was thanked for assisting the authors of its first history. In the 1960s he was one of the first chairmen of the Economic and Social Research Institute.

Publications 
The Economic History of Ireland in the Eighteenth Century (3 Vols.) (1918–1921) 
Essay on Medieval Economic Teaching, Longmans (1920)
Labour Organisation (1921)  
An Essay on the Economic Effects of the Reformation (1923)  
Agricultural Economics (1929) 
The Four Green Fields, Talbot (1936) 
The Phantom of Plenty (1948)

References

External links
 
 
 

1892 births
1973 deaths
Independent members of Seanad Éireann
Members of the 6th Seanad
Members of the 7th Seanad
Members of the 8th Seanad
Members of the 9th Seanad
Members of the 10th Seanad
Academics of University College Dublin
20th-century Irish economists
Statistical and Social Inquiry Society of Ireland
Members of Seanad Éireann for the National University of Ireland